One Shell Plaza (OSP) is a 50-story,  skyscraper at 910 Louisiana Street in Downtown Houston, Texas. At its completion in 1971, the tower was the tallest in the city.

Designers
One Shell Plaza was designed by the architectural firm of Skidmore, Owings & Merrill. Associate architects were Wilson, Morris, Crain & Anderson, and the landscape architects were Sasaki Associates.

The Hancock Whitney Center in New Orleans and Republic Plaza in Denver, also designed by Skidmore, Owings & Merrill, have designs very similar to that of One Shell Plaza. Like One Shell Plaza, the Hancock Whitney Center also has Shell Oil as a major tenant, and was previously named One Shell Square.

Tenants
Shell Oil Company, a subsidiary of Shell plc, was headquartered in this building until 2016. The law firm of Baker Botts is also headquartered there.

As of 2018, NRG Energy occupied the bottom 22 floors of the building.

The Houston Club, on the 49th floor of the building, has dining, entertainment, and meeting facilities.

History
The building opened in 1971 and was renovated in 1994. The $80 million in major renovations included an updated lobby and plaza, elevator modernization, upgrades to the buildings EMP systems, new lighting, and ADA modifications.

The new lease retroactively had the start date of January 1, 2011, and will last for 15 years, ending in 2025.

In March 2012 Hines Interests Limited Partnership announced it was putting the building up for sale.

Antennas
The 170 ft mast atop the building has carried various television and radio signals since the building's completion. The mast supported 1971 start up channel 26 KVRL (later KDOG, now KRIV) and a mast that simultaneously radiated signals for eight FM stations KYND (then 92.5, now KKBQ on 92.9 MHz), 93.7 KRLY (now KQBT), 95.7 KIKK-FM (now KKHH), 99.1 KODA, 100.3 KILT-FM, 101.1 KLOL, 102.1 KLYX (now KMJQ), and 104.1 KRBE. The combiner and antenna was supplied by Electronic Research Inc. One Shell was used until the completion of the then Texas Commerce Tower and Allied Bank Plaza in 1982–1983, creating a skyscraper canyon that causes multipath distortion, and necessitated the move to the Houston antenna farm in Missouri City.

Gallery

In popular culture 

 The building was used as the exterior setting of 'World Oil', a fictional Houston-based firm, as part of initial storylines presented on the former NBC soap opera Another World, but much more on its spinoff soap Texas, which was set in Houston.

See also 
 List of tallest buildings in Texas
 List of tallest buildings in Houston
 List of tallest buildings in the United States

References

External links
FCC-Entry, which gives 300.2 metres as height with antenna

Skyscraper office buildings in Houston
Oil company headquarters in the United States
Office buildings completed in 1971
Shell plc buildings and structures
Skidmore, Owings & Merrill buildings
1971 establishments in Texas